Pterotolithus is a genus of fish in the family Sciaenidae. There are two species, the blotched tiger-toothed croaker (Pterotolithus maculatus)  and the bigmouth croaker (Pterotolithus lateoides).

References

Sciaenidae